British Rail produced a variety of railbuses, both as a means of acquiring new rolling stock cheaply, and to provide economical services on lightly-used lines.

Terminology
Railbuses are a very lightweight type of railcar designed specifically for passenger transport on little-used railway lines. As the name suggests, they share many aspects of their construction with a bus, usually having a bus body, or a modified bus body, and having four wheels on a fixed wheelbase, rather than bogies. Some units were equipped for operation as diesel multiple units.

First generation

In the late 1950s, British Rail tested a series of small railbuses, produced by a variety of manufacturers, for about £12,500 each (£261,000 at 2014 prices). These proved to be very economical (on test the Wickham bus was about ), but were somewhat unreliable. Most of the lines they worked on were closed following the Beeching Cuts and, being non-standard, they were all withdrawn in the mid-1960s, so they were never classified under the TOPS system.

In addition to those railbuses, BR ordered three for departmental (non-revenue earning) service. The full list of passenger and departmental units is set out below.

Engines:
 79960–62/64, Büssing,  at 1,900 rpm
 79963, AEC A220X
 79970–74, AEC, 
 79975–79, AEC,

Second generation

British Rail returned to the idea of railbuses from the mid-1970s, and a prototype four‐wheel vehicle was developed jointly by British Leyland and the British Rail Research Division. Several single and two-car railbuses were built and tested, in co-operation with Leyland (hence the generic term for these vehicles as LEV (Leyland Experimental Vehicle) railbuses). The first three single-car prototypes were essentially Leyland National bus bodies mounted on a modified HSFV1 four-wheeled rail chassis. The prototype two-car railbus was allocated Class 140 and is dealt with on that page, but the prototype single-car railbuses were not classified and are set out in the table below:

In 1978, tests were carried out with a modified double-ended Leyland National bus body placed on an unpowered wagon chassis derived from HSFV1, this was LEV1 (Leyland Experimental Vehicle 1). Whilst in its unpowered state this vehicle never left the Railway Technical Centre in Derby. In 1979 a powertrain was added to LEV1, the engine being a Leyland 510 diesel, and the transmission a mechanical type with self-changing gears.

Even though some of these vehicles carried numbers in the departmental coach series, they were used in ordinary passenger service. LEV1 was initially tested in passenger service in East Anglia, and then elsewhere, before being temporarily exported to the US in the early 1980s. LEV1 was withdrawn and transferred to the National Railway Museum in 1987,  before moving to the North Norfolk Railway, where it underwent restoration, then moving in 2012 to the NRM's Shildon site.

Following export around 1981, it was used on an experimental extension of MBTA (Boston) commuter service to Concord, New Hampshire. When that experiment was ended in 1981 the LEV2 was sold to Amtrak for use on the Northeast Corridor, but it was quickly put out of service after an accident at a crossing. It was subsequently sold to the Steamtown Museum in Scranton, Pennsylvania for use as a shuttle, but was damaged during repair and sold for scrap. It was bought from the scrap dealer by the Durbin & Greenbrier Valley Railroad, a tourist railroad in West Virginia, and later sold to the Connecticut Trolley Museum, where it was eventually scrapped.

In 1985, SEPTA tested a British Rail railbus on the Fox Chase line as part of an effort to restore service to Newtown. Though the trial runs were relatively successful, ride quality was lacklustre, and SEPTA never purchased the railbuses.

Similarly, the BR version of R3 (RDB977020) was run in service on BR for a few years before eventually being sold to Northern Ireland Railways in late 1982, where it was converted to the  Irish gauge. R3, also known as RB003, was withdrawn in 1990 and preserved, initially at the Ulster Transport Museum, then, in 2001, at the Downpatrick & County Down Railway.

Another version, RB004 was built at Derby in 1984. The body was built at the Leyland plant at Workington and BREL Derby C&W were responsible for the underframe and final assembly. It is preserved in running order at the Waverley Route Heritage Association site at Whitrope.

Yet another BREL-Leyland product from c1984, RB002, was exported as a demonstrator, going to the US and Canada, then Denmark and Sweden. Afterwards, the RB002 was used in the Netherlands and Germany, for a demonstration of light rail vehicles on the then defunct railway between Enschede and Gronau.
It returned to the UK, having gained the nickname, "The Denmark", and was used for a while as a classroom/office by BREL but, somehow, it too ended up in Ireland. Its present location is believed to be at the now‐closed standard gauge Riverstown Old Corn Railway near Dundalk, but it is understood to be in a poor state of repair.

Those railbuses  were sent abroad in the hope of gathering export orders, but they never transpired.

In addition, there was an experiment with a loco-hauled Leyland-built vehicle. A National bus-type body was placed on the  underframe from Mk1 BCK coach number 21234. It was numbered RDB 977091 and was run in normal service around the London Midland region, alongside ordinary coaching stock, until withdrawn as being unsuitable. The only direct connection with railbuses was the use of the same type of bus-based body shell to reduce costs to a minimum. The coach is now preserved at the Llanelli and Mynydd Mawr Railway.

Pacers
As a result of those tests, British Rail ordered a series of two- and three-car railbuses, which became known as Pacers (or Skippers in the Western Region), and were allocated TOPS Classes 141–144. The next generation of Sprinter units were based on conventional railway design and bogie-mounted bodies.

Routes 

Lines regularly served by railbuses include:

Scotland 
 Ayr – Dalmellington 1959–1964
 Craigendoran – Arrochar 1959–1964
 Darvel 1959–1964
 Devon Valley 1959–1964
 Falkirk – Grangemouth 1967–1968
 Gleneagles – Crieff / Comrie 1958–1964
 Kilmarnock – Ardrossan / Ayr 1962-1964
 Larbert – Alloa 1967–1968
 Lugton – Beith 1959–1962
 Speyside 1958–1965

East Anglia 
 Cambridge to Mildenhall railway
 Witham-Braintree branch line
 Witham-Maldon branch line
 Saffron Walden Railway

Midlands 
 Bedford – Northampton / Hitchin 1958–1959
 Millers Dale – Buxton 1966–1967

Western 
 Bodmin – Wadebridge 1964–1967
 Kemble – Cirencester Town and Kemble-Tetbury 1959–1964
 Yeovil Junction – Yeovil Town 1964–1966 – Pen Mill 1966

Preservation 
A number of the BR railbuses, both first and second generation examples have survived into preservation, as follows:

Additionally, AC Cars railbus 79979 was preserved. It was the first of the railbuses to be delivered and spent all its working life in Scotland. In 1968, it was moved to Craigentinny where the chassis was scrapped, and it was used as a battery store. It was moved to make way for the TMD in 1977 and the grounded body sold to the Strathspey Railway in 1977. It was scrapped by MC Metals, Glasgow, in 1990.

See also
British Rail Class 139
Pacerailer - prototype railbus built 1960s, by a private company.

References

External links

AC Cars Railbus
EM2 Locomotive Society – owners of Drewry railcar DB998901.
Old Dalby Test Track site – Pictures of the Drewry car RDB998901 in action at BR's test track
Wickham Railbus Group – owners of Wickham railbus DB999507.
Train Testing site – Pictures of the testing and travels of the early railbuses
Train Testing site – Pictures of LEV1 in the US
departmentals.com
The Railbus Trust – Working to protect the future of Single Car Railbuses and Second Generation DMU prototypes.

Railbuses
Railcars of the United Kingdom
Bristol Commercial Vehicles
D. Wickham and Company rolling stock
Park Royal Vehicles multiple units
AC vehicles
Train-related introductions in 1950
Train-related introductions in 1978